Maud or Matilda Fitzroy, was a duchess consort of Brittany by her marriage to Conan III, Duke of Brittany. She was an illegitimate daughter of Henry I of England by one of his unknown mistresses.

Duchess consort of Brittany
Matilda married, before 1113, Conan III, Duke of Brittany, and had:
Hoel (1116 - 1156) – disinherited from the Ducal crown; Count of Nantes; 
Bertha (1114 - after 1155) – married Alan of Penthièvre; upon Alan's death in 1146, she returned to Brittany.
Constance (1120 - 1148) – married  Sir Geoffroy II, Sire de Mayenne, son of Juhel II, Seigneur de Mayenne.

Notes

References

Sources

Year of death missing
Duchesses of Brittany
Illegitimate children of Henry I of England
12th-century English people
12th-century English women
Year of birth missing
12th-century Breton people
12th-century French women
12th-century French people
Daughters of kings